Woodruff's plexus was discovered by George H. Woodruff in 1949. The plexus is located below the posterior end of the inferior concha, on the lateral wall of the nasal cavity. He described it as the naso-nasopharyngeal plexus.

Structure 
Woodruff's plexus is located on the lateral wall of the nasal cavity below the posterior end of the inferior nasal concha (turbinate). The plexus is of large thin-walled veins which lie in a thin mucosa.

Clinical significance

Bleeding 
A nosebleed (epistaxis) usually occurs in the anterior part of the nose from an area known as Kiesselbach's plexus which consists of arteries. Woodruff's plexus is a venous plexus in the posterior part and a nosebleed here accounts for only between 5 and 10 per cent of nosebleeds. Older adults are most often affected.

Treatment 
Posterior nasal packing is needed for posterior epistaxis.

References

Nose disorders